James C. Kaplan, Jr. (born September 10, 1951) is an American novelist, journalist, and biographer.

Biography
He was born in New York City and grew up in rural Pennsylvania and suburban New Jersey. He matriculated at New York University and graduated from Wesleyan University in 1973 with a degree in studio art. After graduation, Kaplan studied painting at the New York Studio School in Greenwich Village. He is the brother of editor Peter Kaplan.

In the mid-1970s, he worked as a typist at The New Yorker Magazine, where he came under the tutelage of the writer and editor William Maxwell. In the late 1970s and early 1980s, he published a number of short stories in The New Yorker. In the mid 1980s, Kaplan worked for several years as a screenwriter for Warner Brothers. Since the late 1980s, he has been a writer of magazine profiles for Vanity Fair, Entertainment Weekly, New York Magazine, The New York Times Magazine, Esquire, and The New Yorker, among others.

He is the author of the following books, amongst other works:

Sinatra: The Chairman (2015)
 Frank: The Voice (2010) (selected by Michiko Kakutani of The New York Times as one of her Top 10 Books of 2010)
 Two Guys from Verona: A Novel of Suburbia (1999) (held in almost 700 libraries according to WorldCat), a New York Times Notable Book of the Year
 The Airport: Terminal Nights and Runway Days at John F. Kennedy International (1994)
 Pearl's Progress (1989)

He is the co-author of the following biographies:

 With Jerry Lewis, a memoir of Lewis's relationship with Dean Martin, Dean & Me (A Love Story) (2005) (held in over 1300 libraries according to WorldCat)
 With John McEnroe, You Cannot Be Serious (2002) (held in over 1400 libraries according to WorldCat)

Kaplan's fiction has been compared, by Francine Prose and David Gates, to that of John Updike, Vladimir Nabokov, and J.D. Salinger. His short fiction has appeared in The Best American Short Stories. He has appeared as a guest on The Charlie Rose Show. Kaplan is the 2011 Joan Jakobson Visiting Writer at Wesleyan University.

Personal life
Kaplan lives in Hastings-on-Hudson, New York with his wife and son.

References

External links
Official website
Random House page for Frank: The Voice

1951 births
20th-century American novelists
20th-century American biographers
Jewish American journalists
American male journalists
American male novelists
Living people
American male biographers
People from South Orange, New Jersey
Wesleyan University alumni
20th-century American male writers
21st-century American Jews